Zlatia or Zlatiya may refer to:

 Zlatia (region), a plateau in Montana and Vratsa Provinces, Bulgaria
 Zlatia, Dobrich Province, a village in Dobrichka Municipality, Bulgaria
 Zlatia, Montana Province, a village in Valchedram Municipality, Bulgaria
 Zlatiya Glacier, Antarctica